
The Japanese manga series Yona of the Dawn is written and illustrated by Mizuho Kusanagi.  Kusanagi began serializing the manga in Hakusensha's Hana to Yume shōjo manga magazine on August 4, 2009.

The story follows Yona, a princess of the fictional kingdom of Kohka.  She is forced to go on the run with her friend and bodyguard Son Hak when her childhood friend Su-won murders her father and takes the throne.

Viz Media announced their license to the series during their panel at New York Comic Con on October 9, 2015, along with their plans to publish the first volume in summer 2016.

An original anime DVD adapting two bonus chapters from the twelfth volume was included in a limited edition of the manga's nineteenth volume on September 18, 2015.  Two more OADs will be included with the twenty-first and twenty second volumes of the manga on August 19, 2016, and December 20, 2016, respectively.

Hakusensha published the first tankōbon volume on January 19, 2010, and since then a total of forty volumes have been released. Viz Media published the first volume in North America on August 2, 2016.

Volumes

Novel

References

External links
  at Hana to Yume 

Yona of the Dawn